Austin James Brodeur (born October 4, 1996) is an American former basketball player. He played college basketball for the Penn Quakers and professionally in Germany, Iceland, and Belgium.

Early life and high school career
Brodeur grew up in Northborough, Massachusetts and originally attended Algonquin Regional High School for two years before transferring to Northfield Mount Hermon School and played basketball and volleyball at both schools. As a sophomore at Algonquin, he averaged 17.5 points, 15.5 rebounds and 7 blocks and was named to the Telegram & Gazette Regional Super Team. He reclassified as a sophomore after transferring to Northfield-Mount Hermon. As a senior, Brodeur averaged 15.6 points, 8.7 rebounds and 3.1 assists per game and was named first team All-State by USA Today as he helped lead the Hoggers to the New England Preparatory School Athletic Council Class AAA title.

College career
Brodeur became a starter for the Quakers as a true freshman and was named second team All-Ivy League after leading the team with 13.8 points and 6.8 rebounds per game. As a sophomore, he averaged 13.1 points and 7.2 rebounds per game and was named first team All-Ivy and second team All-Big 5. Brodeur helped Penn reach the NCAA Tournament. Brodeur was named the Most Outstanding Player of the 2018 Ivy League men's basketball tournament after scoring 25 points and grabbing 10 rebounds in a semifinal win against Yale and scoring 16 points with 10 rebounds in the conference championship game against Harvard. He was again named first team All-Ivy and first team All-Big 5 as a junior after averaging 17.6 points and 8.3 rebounds per game. Brodeur became Penn's All-time leading scorer, passing Ernie Beck, and career leader in blocked shots on March 7, 2020 in a 85–60 win over Columbia while also recording the first triple double in school history in a 21-point, 10 rebound, 10 assist performance. Brodeur averaged 17.3 points, 8.9 rebounds, and 5.2 assists per game as a senior and was named first team All-Ivy for as third straight season and the Ivy League Co-Player of the year alongside Paul Atkinson as well as first team All-District 13 by the National Association of Basketball Coaches. He was also named to the First Team All-Big 5. Brodeur criticized the Ivy League for cancelling its men's basketball tournament due to the COVID-19 pandemic, saying "it doesn't feel right."

Professional career
On July 23, 2020, Brodeur signed with Riesen Ludwigsburg of the German Basketball Bundesliga (BBL). However, he was released on September 11 as he did not pass the physical.

On October 14, 2020, he has signed a two-month contract, with the option to extend until the end of the season, with Mitteldeutscher of the Basketball Bundesliga.

In January 2021, Brodeur signed with Stjarnan of the Icelandic Úrvalsdeild karla. During the regular season, he averaged 13.6 points and 7.6 rebounds per game. He helped Stjarnan to the semi-finals in the playoffs where it was eventually knocked out by Þór Þorlákshöfn. In 10 playoff games, he averaged 11.8 points and 7.1 rebounds per game.

In May 2021, Brodeur signed with Belgian club Kangoeroes Mechelen for the 2021–22 BNXT League season.

Career statistics

College

|-
| style="text-align:left;"| 2016–17
| style="text-align:left;"| Penn
| 28 || 28 || 30.9 || .526 || .421 || .607 || 6.9 || 1.9 || 1.0 || 2.4 || 13.8
|-
| style="text-align:left;"| 2017–18
| style="text-align:left;"| Penn
| 33 || 33 || 31.0 || .538 || .286 || .611 || 7.2 || 2.5 || .9 || 1.2 || 13.1
|-
| style="text-align:left;"| 2018–19
| style="text-align:left;"| Penn
| 31 || 31 || 32.5 || .528 || .340 || .576 || 8.3 || 3.6 || 1.0 || 1.3 || 17.6
|-
| style="text-align:left;"| 2019–20
| style="text-align:left;"| Penn
| 27 || 27 || 34.6 || .504 || .274 || .716 || 8.9 || 5.2 || 1.1 || 1.8 || 17.3
|- class="sortbottom"
| style="text-align:center;" colspan="2"| Career
| 119 || 119 || 32.2 || .524 || .308 || .625 || 7.8 || 3.3 || 1.0 || 1.6 || 15.4

References

External links
Penn Quakers bio
RealGM Profile
Icelandic statistics at Icelandic Basketball Association

1996 births
Living people
American expatriate basketball people in Belgium
American expatriate basketball people in Germany
American expatriate basketball people in Iceland
American men's basketball players
Basketball players from Massachusetts
Kangoeroes Basket Mechelen players
Mitteldeutscher BC players
Penn Quakers men's basketball players
People from Northborough, Massachusetts
Power forwards (basketball)
Stjarnan men's basketball players
Sportspeople from Worcester County, Massachusetts
Úrvalsdeild karla (basketball) players